Roderick Ian "Derry" Gill (21 July 1919 – 28 October 1983) was an Irish cricketer. A right-handed batsman and right-arm medium pace bowler, he played seven times for the Ireland cricket team between 1947 and 1951, including three first-class matches.

Playing career

Gill made his debut for Ireland in May 1947, playing against Scotland in a first-class match. He played a match against the Craven Gentlemen the following month, before spending two years outside the Ireland team, his next game coming in August 1949 against the MCC at Lord's

He played three times for Ireland in 1950, against Scotland, Nottinghamshire and the MCC. Against Scotland, he scored 37 in the Ireland first innings, his highest score for Ireland. Against the MCC, in his final first-class match, he took 2/19 in the MCC first innings, his best bowling figures for Ireland. These are also his best first-class performances. The following year, he played his last match for Ireland, against the MCC at Lord's.

Statistics

In all matches for Ireland, he scored 127 runs at an average of 11.55, and took four wickets at an average of 47.25.

References

1919 births
1983 deaths
Cricketers from Dublin (city)
Irish cricketers